The St. Cloud Rock'n Rollers was a professional basketball club based in St. Cloud, Minnesota that competed in the International Basketball Association beginning in the 1995–96 season. The team folded after just one season.

Personnel
 Head Coach: Jay Garmetz
 Director of Marketing: Gerald VanDiver
 PA Announcer: Rollie Lange

Season results

References

External links

Defunct basketball teams in the United States
Sports in St. Cloud, Minnesota
Basketball teams in Minnesota
1995 establishments in Minnesota
1996 disestablishments in Minnesota
Basketball teams established in 1995
Sports clubs disestablished in 1996